= Calegaro =

Italian silversmith and jewellery company

Coordinates: 45.3728676°N 11.735417°E

Fratelli Calegaro
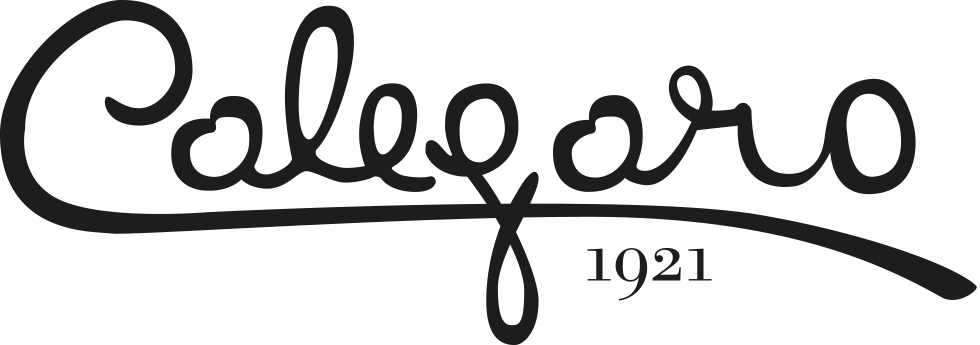
- Company type: Private
- Industry: Silversmith
- Founded: 1921
- Headquarters: Teolo, Italy
- Products: Silverware, jewellery, interior design
- Website: calegaro.it

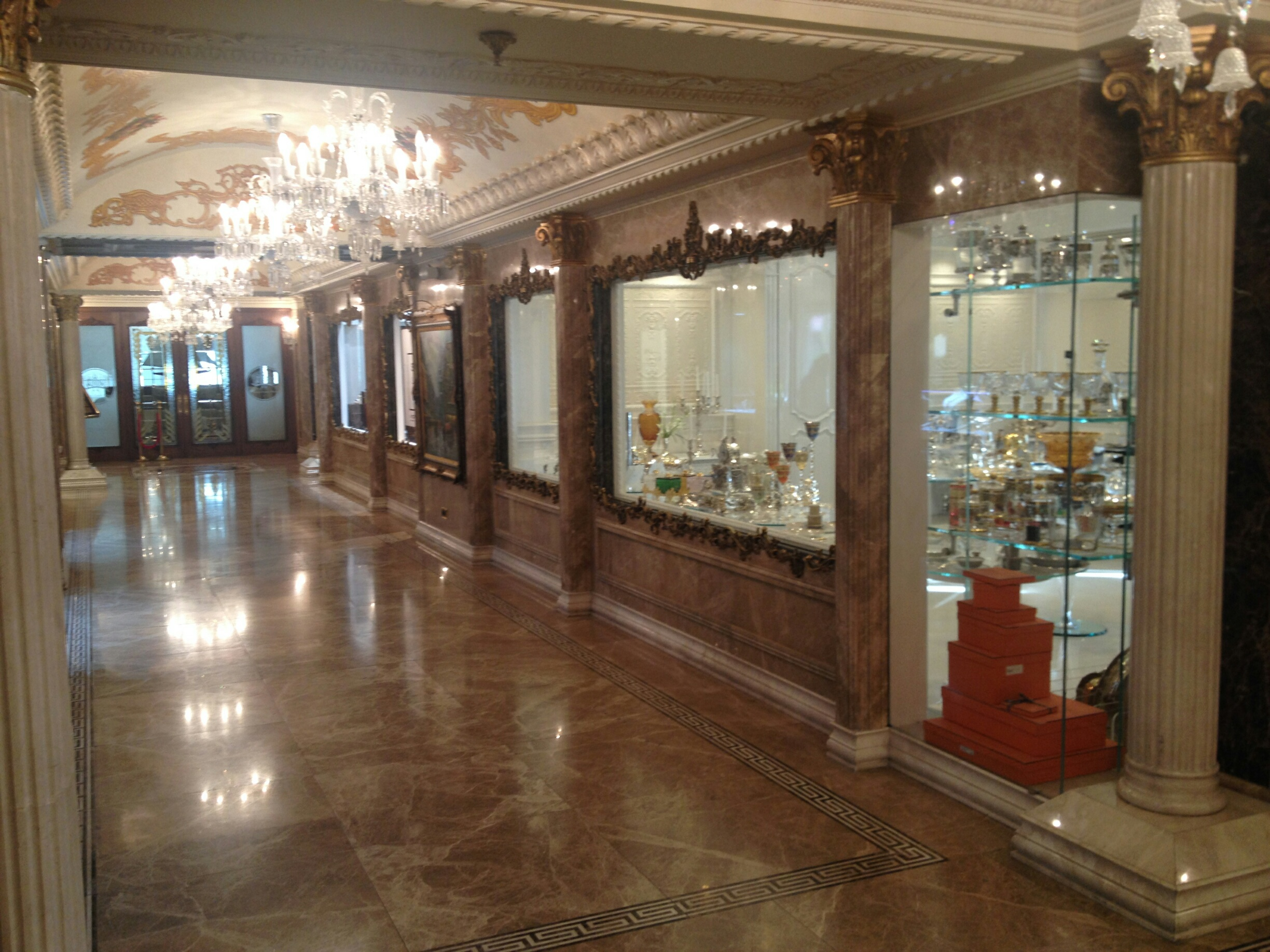
Calegaro shop - Modern Elahieh - Tehran

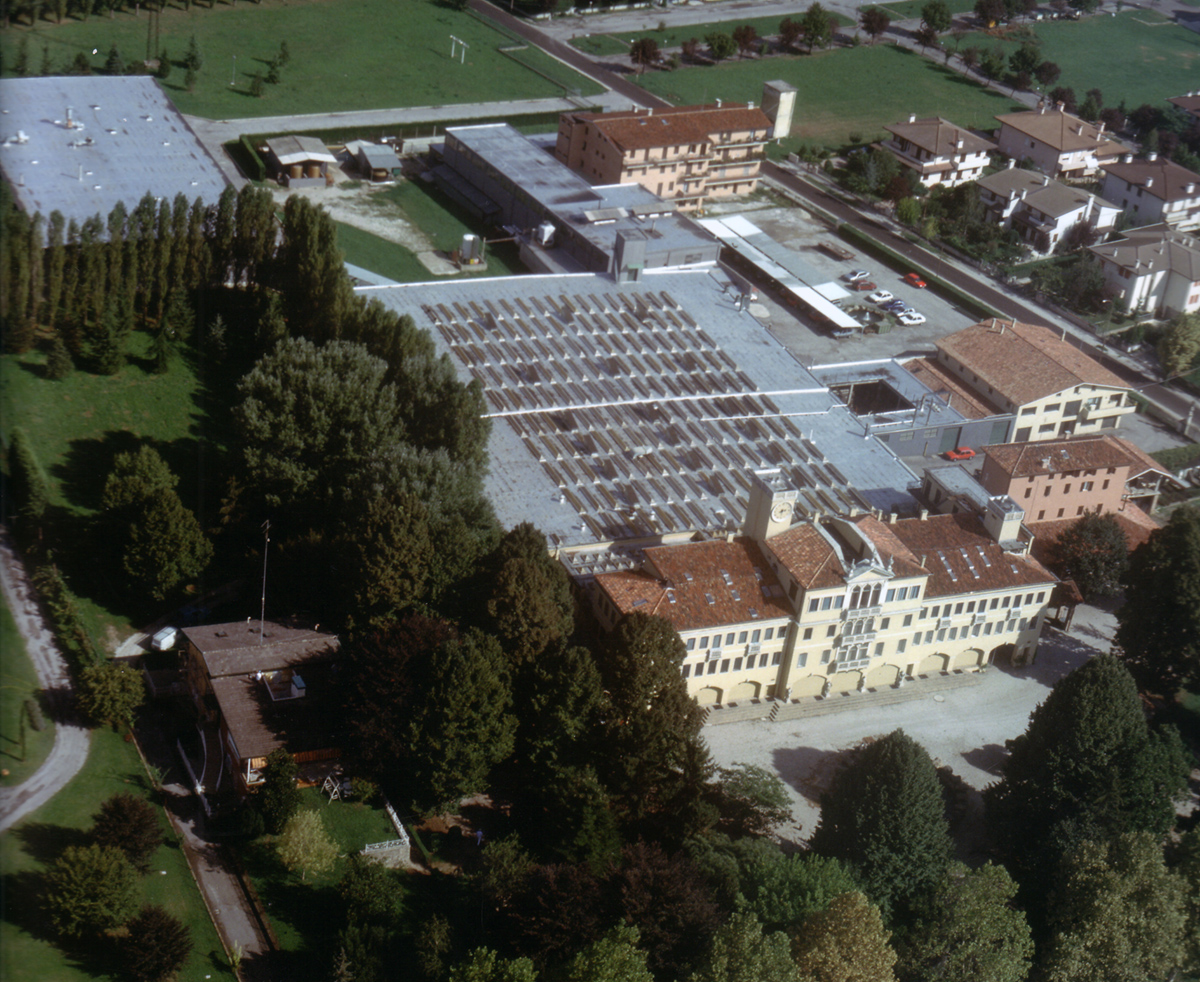
Calegaro HQ - Teolo (PD)

Calegaro is an Italian silversmith and jewellery company founded in Padova, Italy, in 1921.

== History ==
Luigi Calegaro opened a laboratory in 1921 in Via del Santo, midtown Padova, and was one of its first jewellery and silversmith makers with hallmark 4PD. Business quickly developed and in 1968 a new location for production was chosen in Teolo, the area of Colli Euganei in the surrounding of Padova. It was under the guide of Luigi's son, Francesco Calegaro, that Company constantly grew making its name in the market. At present, the facility has a production complex of 12.000 m^{2} on a total area of 40.000 m^{2}. Apart from its wide sterling silver and gold collection, Calegaro partners as a vendor for Luxury major Brands producing their exclusive designs.

In 2010 some of these productions have been shown in the British Museum of London.

== Expansion ==
In 2012 Calegaro opened its second boutique in Tehran, Iran.

In 2016 the first collection for interior design has been presented featuring furniture in finest wood and sterling silver.
